Appignanesi is a surname. It may refer to:

Ennio Appignanesi (1925–2015), Italian Roman Catholic archbishop
Josh Appignanesi (born 1975), British film director, producer, and screenwriter
Lisa Appignanesi, British writer, novelist, and campaigner for free expression
Richard Appignanesi (born 1940), Canadian writer and editor